West Bridge, also designated Bridge 6527, is a historic truss bridge over the Watonwan River in Madelia, Minnesota, United States. It was listed on the National Register of Historic Places in 2013 for its state-level significance in the theme of transportation. It was nominated for being the only surviving work of seminal Minnesota bridge builder Commodore P. Jones, and for its early use of riveted joints.

West Bridge was converted to a pedestrian bridge in 1990, with vehicular traffic routed over a new bridge immediately adjacent to the old one. It has since been closed to all use.

See also
List of bridges documented by the Historic American Engineering Record in Minnesota
National Register of Historic Places listings in Watonwan County, Minnesota

References

External links

1908 establishments in Minnesota
Bridges completed in 1908
Buildings and structures in Watonwan County, Minnesota
Former road bridges in Minnesota
Historic American Engineering Record in Minnesota
National Register of Historic Places in Watonwan County, Minnesota
Road bridges on the National Register of Historic Places in Minnesota
Steel bridges in the United States
Warren truss bridges in the United States